QSC&V (Quality, Service, Cleanliness & Value) is a corporate motto adopted by McDonald's to describe the company's philosophy for operating restaurants.  The motto is codified in the procedures McDonald's uses to evaluate its franchisees.

References

McDonald's